Portal Runner is a platform video game developed and published by The 3DO Company for PlayStation 2 and Game Boy Color.

Overview
Portal Runner is a spin-off in the Army Men video game series, focusing on a conflict between characters Vikki Grimm and Brigitte Bleu.

Plot
The story starts when General Plastro, the general of the Tan army, was captured by the Green Army and locked away during the events of Army Men: Sarge's Heroes 2. Brigitte Bleu observes this through a magic mirror and makes sinister plans to marry Sarge and get rid of Vikki Grimm, Colonel Grimm's daughter and Sarge's girlfriend. Brigitte decides that she is lonesome, and needs a king worthy of her magnificence, and says that Vikki is a treasure waiting to be buried.

After Vikki saves Sarge from attacking gingerbread men, she is reprimanded by her father, Colonel Grimm for putting herself in danger. As she leaves, a Green Army soldier gives her a package from an unknown person. Inside was a dinosaur egg and a letter, saying "the story of your career awaits you. Follow the map and seek out the one called Rage. Tell no one, leave now". Sarge walks up and tells her that her father’s rights about her being too adventurous for her own good. Vikki walks off in disgust, with Sarge commenting how that was a good start and how he’ll be buying plastic flowers for a week.

As she traverses the Lost Caves, she is ambushed by Rage (a WarBot, an evil toy robot; WarBots first appeared in Army Men: Sarge's Heroes 2), Brigitte's WarBot friend who will do whatever she says, and is forced to the prehistoric jungle toy world. That was also when she meets a lion, who was also forced to the same world as Rage destroys the portal. Vikki decides to befriend the lion and names him Leo, who makes his friendship with her known by licking her, and they both help each other to get home.

After enduring magic pillars, a pyramid, and magic air lifts, they come upon a volcano with another portal. Once they step through, they end up in a medieval world. Vikki rescues a wizard named Merlin from a deadly chessboard. Merlin explains that he made a magic mirror that could see anywhere for Brigitte, thinking she would appreciate his mind. He directs Vikki to another portal, guarded by a ghostly barrier, an evil tree, and a moat dragon. When they reach the portal, they're captured by Rage and Tan Soldiers who appear to be minions of Brigitte.

Brigitte had lured Sarge into the dollhouse where she lived and wanted to marry him. She and her henchmen found a space-alien themed toy set, which acted as a portal to an Outer Space World. Brigitte acquired a love gun from some Martians, who lived in the Space World in exchange for the secret of the portals; she used the gun on Sarge, and he instantly fell in love with her.

Brigitte visited Vikki, who was being held in the dungeon, and told her that Sarge and she are going to get married. Brigitte leaves her mirror for Vikki to let her watch the wedding. As Vikki cries to herself, she's contacted by Merlin. He informs her that he left a few secrets in the mirror before handing it over. When Vikki asks about Sarge's situation, Merlin tells her only the kiss of his true love can apparently break the inducement. She asks if he’s kidding, which he isn’t. Meanwhile, in a toy store, Leo is being transported in a circus carriage, and is about to be burned in a microwave when he notices the bars are melting. He breaks out and travels to a portal that takes him back to the Medieval Castle.

He and Vikki head to the Space World to stop the wedding. Once they acquire a stolen key from a Martian saucer, Vikki breaks into the room and kisses Sarge, breaking the trance on him. A voice tells all Martians to report for battle. Vikki tells Brigitte to call off the attack. She tries, but some monitors show they're now attacking all the other worlds. They split up; Sarge goes with Leo to stop most of the aliens while Vikki heads to the Alien Brain room, where the Brain, a cyborgic-style creature resembling a Martian head on a robotic spider body, refuses to call off the attack.

After Vikki destroys the Brain, the attack stops. Sarge and Leo meet up with her, as Merlin congratulates Vikki for stopping the attack, and they head back to the Plastic World. At the Lost Caves, three lion cubs run up to Leo. Showing that he wasn't guarding the Portals, but protecting his family, he stays. Back at the Green Army Base, Vikki apologizes to Colonel Grimm and says that her home is wherever he is, with her father thanking her.

The game ends with Brigitte sharing a cell with General Plastro, who tells her that before she gets any funny ideas, the top bunk is his and he blows a raspberry. Brigitte yells out "Noooooo!"

Reception and controversy

The PlayStation 2 version received "mixed" reviews according to video game review aggregator Metacritic.  The Game Boy Color version gave an earliest review from Nintendo Power, which gave it a score of two-and-a-half stars out of five, just nearly five months before the game was released.

The PS2 version gained notoriety when it was panned by GamePro, with a rating of 2.3 out of 5. GamePro was the first to review the game, saying that it "looks like a late-generation PlayStation title rather than a second-generation PS2 effort". Trip Hawkins, then-president of 3DO and publisher of Portal Runner, sent an angry email to John Rousseau, who was president of GamePro. The email was published on the internet in its entirety. In the email, Hawkins told Rousseau that Rousseau's customers were the advertisers, not the readers, and implied that the reviews should be written to keep the advertisers happy. Hawkins wrote: "...there is something wrong with (the reviewer), not with Portal Runner. If you disagree with me, you do so at your own peril.... I should mention in passing that 3DO has been one of your largest advertisers. Effective immediately, we are going to have to cut that back".

References

External links

Army Men
2001 video games
Cancelled Game Boy Advance games
Game Boy Color games
Multiplayer and single-player video games
Platform games
PlayStation 2 games
Video games developed in the United States
Video games featuring female protagonists
Video game spin-offs